Digital Science (or Digital Science & Research Solutions Ltd) is a technology company with its headquarters in London, United Kingdom.
The company focuses on strategic investments into startup companies that support the research lifecycle.

History
Digital Science was founded in 2010. It was initially the technical division of Nature Publishing Group/Macmillan and is now operated as an independent company by Holtzbrinck Publishing Group.  They are one of the organizers of Science Foo Camp along with Nature, Google and O'Reilly.

Since 2013, Digital Science has released a number of collaborative reports using data generated from their portfolio companies featured in media outlets. The company worked with HEFCE and King's College London in 2015, following the inclusion of Research Impact in the Research Excellence Framework (REF), to analyse the results and provide access to the case studies to the public.

Digital Science launched a Global Research Identifier Database (GRID)  for identifying research institutions around the world in 2015. Through the Digital Science Catalyst Grant the company has supported a number of early-stage ideas such as Nutonian, TetraScience and Penelope as well as community schemes including Ada Lovelace Day.

In 2013 it invested in UberResearch which launched "Dimensions" in 2016, a searchable database of research funds.

On 15 January 2018, Digital Science re-launched an extended version of Dimensions, a commercial scholarly search platform that allows to search publications, datasets, grants, patents and clinical trials. The free version of the platform allows searching for publications and datasets only. 

Several studies published in 2021 compared Dimensions with its subscription-based commercial competitors, and unanimously found that Dimensions.ai provides broader temporal and publication source coverage than Scopus and Web of Science in most subject areas, and that Dimensions is closer in its coverage to free aggregation databases, such as The Lens and Google Scholar.  

As of October 2021, Dimensions.ai covers nearly 106 million publications with over 1.2 billion citations.

Key people
 From 2010 to 2015, Timo Hannay was Managing Director
 From 2013 to 2015, Amy Brand held the role of VP academic & research relations before moving to become Director of MIT Press.
 From 2015 to present, Daniel W. Hook acts as Chief Executive Officer.

Catalyst Grant Winners

See also
List of academic databases and search engines

References 

Software companies of the United Kingdom
Companies based in the London Borough of Islington
British companies established in 2010
Investment companies of the United Kingdom